The Helsinki Ice Challenge was a series of two ice hockey regular season games (one for the Kontinental Hockey League (KHL) and one for the SM-liiga respectively) which were scheduled to be played outdoors. Jokerit played against SKA Saint Petersburg in the first match  and the second match was HIFK playing against Oulun Kärpät. Both games took place at Kaisaniemi Park in Helsinki, Finland on December 2 and December 5, 2017 respectively.

The Games
Bolded teams denote winners

References

Outdoor ice hockey games
December 2017 sports events in Europe
2017–18 in Finnish ice hockey
2010s in Helsinki
Sports competitions in Helsinki
Liiga
2017–18 KHL season